Hope Woodlands is an extensive civil parish in the High Peak district of Derbyshire in England.

The parish covers the Woodlands Valley, the western Upper Derwent Valley, the northern half of Kinder Scout and much of Bleaklow. The only habitations in the parish are remote farms, forming small clusters at Upper Ashop and Alport. According to the 2001 UK census, the parish had a population of 68 people.

Socialist and suffragette Hannah Mitchell was born here in 1872.

See also
Listed buildings in Hope Woodlands

References

Civil parishes in Derbyshire